Robby Blackwell (born September 21, 1986, in Dallas, Texas) is an American singer-songwriter, producer, and instrumentalist. He released his first single, "Killer" in 2011, and co-founded the R&B/hip hop ensemble REDi in 2012.

Biography

Early life
Robby Blackwell was born on September 21, 1985, and grew up in Dallas, Texas. The son of two teachers, he became involved with music at a young age – enrolling in choir, tap dance, hip hop, music production, piano and other instrument lessons. He credits Pink Floyd, Prince, Kanye West, Michael Jackson, and Usher as among his musical influences. He moved to Los Angeles after graduation to intern at Jive Records.

Career 
Blackwell's single "Killer" was released in June 2011. Currently, he is working on an as-yet untitled EP. Previously he worked for Sony, going on to work with and perform with producer and guitarist Jon Redwine. In 2012 he joined Redwine, Rob. A!, and Aundrus Poole in co-founding REDi, an urban pop ensemble which has performed at South by Southwest in Austin, Texas and released one album.

Discography

Singles
2011: "Killer" produced by Jon Redwine
2011: "Centerfold" produced by Jon Redwine
2011: "Balmain Bombshell" produced by Jon Redwine
2012: "Light the Club" with REDi produced by Jon Redwine

Albums
2012: Red Pill with REDi

References

Further reading
Edge Magazine: Jon Redwine & Robby Blackwell Interview
Fkn' Famous: KORG SWSW Showcase Interview (March 2012)

External links

Robby Blackwell on Facebook
Robby Blackwell on Twitter

Living people
1986 births
American contemporary R&B singers
People from Dallas
Songwriters from Texas
21st-century American singers